Dimitris Flionis (alternate spelling: Dimitrios) (born April 8, 1997) is a Greek professional basketball player for AEK Athens of the Greek Basket League and the Basketball Champions League. He is a 1.90 m (6 ft 2 in) tall combo guard.

Professional career
Flionis began playing basketball with the junior youth teams of Aris Thessaloniki. He began his pro career with the senior men's team of Aris in 2015, by playing in his first career official game at the pro level, during the Greek Basket League 2014–15 season's playoffs. On June 30, 2018, Aris announced that they had rescinded their contract extension offer towards Flionis. However, four days later, on July 3, the team and the player officially agreed on a new two-year deal.

During the 2019-20 season, Flionis averaged 4.1 points, 2.2 rebounds and 2.1 assists per game. He re-signed with Aris on September 21, 2020. He went on to average 5.4 points, 2.7 rebounds, and 2.8 assists during the 2020-21 season.

On August 12, 2021, Flionis signed a two-year deal with AEK Athens. On March 18, 2022, he renewed his contract through 2025. In 23 league games, he averaged 6 points, 3.6 rebounds, 1.6 assists and 1 steal, playing around 24 minutes per contest.

Greece national team
Flionis was included in the Greece junior national teams for the 2013 FIBA Europe Under-16 Championship, where they won a bronze medal, for the 2014 FIBA Under-17 World Cup, and for the 2015 FIBA Europe Under-18 Championship, where they won a gold medal. He also played at the 2017 FIBA Europe Under-20 Championship, where they won a gold medal.

References

External links
EuroCup Profile
FIBA Profile
FIBA Europe Profile
Eurobasket.com Profile
Greek Basket League Profile 
Hellenic Federation Profile 

1997 births
Living people
AEK B.C. players
Aris B.C. players
Basketball players from Thessaloniki
Greek Basket League players
Greek men's basketball players
Point guards
Shooting guards